The 2010 Tour of Qatar was the ninth edition of the Tour of Qatar cycling stage race. It was rated as a 2.1 event on the UCI Asia Tour, and was held from 7 February to 12 February 2010, in Qatar.

Teams
Sixteen teams competed in the 2010 Tour of Qatar. These included ten UCI ProTour teams, five UCI Professional Continental teams, and one Continental team. Each team entered a squad of eight riders, giving the Tour a peloton of 128 riders.

The teams participating in the race were:

Trek-Livestrong U23

The same sixteen teams contested the inaugural Tour of Oman, which began on February 14. The teams' squads were expected to be similar for both events, with the individual time trial which closes out the Tour of Oman providing for the only minor changes.

Stages

Stage 1

7 February 2010 – West Bay Lagoon,  (team time trial)

Edvald Boasson Hagen was the first member of the team to cross the line, giving him the golden jersey. Defending Tour champion Tom Boonen's  team was fifth, putting him 20 seconds off the race lead.

The TestTeam was penalized a minute due to Heinrich Haussler pushing Gabriel Rasch after taking a turn on the front. The team protested the penalty, denying that the push was meant to gain any competitive advantage, with Haussler saying that it instead was to help Rasch avoid crashing. The penalty was upheld, and pre-race contender Haussler was placed over a minute off the race lead. The team's sporting director considered withdrawing them from the race because of the penalty, but decided against it.

Stage 2
8 February 2010 – Camel Race Track to Qatar Foundation, 
Almost straight away, when racing got underway, a group of two, Geert Steurs and Wouter Mol attacked and immediately got a few minutes over the peloton. As the race went on, they increased their advantage to well over 12 minutes.

However the peloton was not content to this breakaway. Golden jersey holder Edvald Boasson Hagen missed out on the breakaways and with approximately 40 km to go suffered a punctured tire which put him 11 minutes behind the lead group of riders.

Heading into the final kilometer, the lead group held 2 and a half minute advantage and it was Steurs who won the stage, but with Mol becoming the overall leader.

Stage 3
9 February 2010 – Dukhan to Mesaieed, 

Tom Boonen won his 16th career stage at the Tour of Qatar.

It was the first time in the Tour of Qatar's history where a stage started from the city of Dukhan in the west of the country. Unlike the previous days, the wind dropped and was favourable for almost the whole course.

Like the previous day, within  a breakaway occurred. The biggest lead they had over the peloton was 55 seconds, and they were caught a mere  from the start.

At the  mark, another group of riders broke away and they managed to get a 2:30 lead on the peloton. At that point,  and  took the role of reeling the breakaway group back in, which they caught at the  mark.

Stage 4
10 February 2010 – The Pearl to Al Khor Corniche, 

It was Italian Francesco Chicchi claiming a final sprint to the line with Heinrich Haussler coming in second, and Juan José Haedo arriving third.

Like the previous stages, breakaways occurred and most were quickly reeled in. Sep Vanmarcke from  made a break from the peloton and was away for much of the stage. For the next , the gap hovered around the 1 minute and 45 second mark with the sprinters teams holding back on making a move until later in the stage.

In the final kilometer the peloton was strung out in a long line and the pace was that high that a small split occurred.

With  to go it was Theo Bos leading out the sprint to the line, trying to deliver Haussler first. Haussler had missed Bos' wheel, though, and with their teammate Roger Hammond directing Bos to continue his leadout, Haussler's chance at victory was quickly gone. Chicchi made his winning move peeling out and got into the clear. No one could match his blistering pace and he crossed the line three bike lengths ahead of Haussler in second.

Stage 5
11 February 2010 – Lusail to Madinat Al Shamal, 

Stage 5 came down to a sprint and for the second time in the Tour it was Tom Boonen claiming victory at the finish line. It was his 17th career stage win at the Tour of Qatar. While the victory gave him ten bonus seconds, the Belgian speedster still stood almost two minutes behind race leader Wouter Mol at day's end.

A group of notables got away from the main peloton in a counterattack – this group consisted of the overall leader, Mol, the youth leader, Roger Kluge, Fabian Cancellara, and sprinters Boonen, Tyler Farrar, Heinrich Haussler, Juan José Haedo, and Daniele Bennati. The peloton never allowed them to get too far ahead and were eventually reeled in.

The stage victory for Boonen put him within 8 points of Haussler for the points classification silver jersey.

Stage 6
12 February 2010 – Al Wakra to Doha Corniche,

Classification leadership
In the 2010 Tour of Qatar, three different jerseys are awarded. For the general classification, calculated by adding each cyclist's finishing times on each stage, and allowing time bonuses for the first three finishers on each stage and in intermediate sprints, the leader receives a golden jersey. This classification is considered the most important of the Tour of Qatar, and the winner is considered the winner of the Tour.

Additionally, there is a points classification, which awards a silver jersey. In the points classification, cyclists get points for finishing in the top three in an intermediate sprint or the top twenty of a stage. The first in an intermediate sprint gets 3 points, second 2, and third a single point. The stage win affords 30 points, second is worth 27 points, 25 for third, 23 for fourth, 21 for fifth, 19 for sixth, 17 for seventh, 15 for eighth, 13 for ninth, 11 for tenth, and one point less per place down the line, to a single point for twentieth.

There is also a youth classification, which awards a blue jersey. This classification is calculated the same as the general classification, but only riders born on or after January 1, 1985, are eligible.

The race also awards a teams classification, which is not represented by a jersey. The teams classification is calculated by adding the times of each team's best three riders per stage per day.

Final standings

General classification

Points classification

Young riders' classification

Team classification

References

External links

2010 in road cycling
2010 in Qatari sport
2010
February 2010 sports events in Asia